Wąbrzeźno  is a town in Poland, in the Kuyavian-Pomeranian Voivodeship, about  northeast of Toruń. It is the capital of the Wąbrzeźno County.  The population is 13,971 inhabitants (2004).

History 
Along with Chełmno Land, the area was part of medieval Poland, since its establishment in the 10th century. Archaeologists have discovered medieval treasures, mostly from the 11th century, confirming medieval trade with the neighboring regions of Kuyavia and Prussia. At the beginning of the 13th century, a trade route developed that crossed over an isthmus between two large lakes, the Sicieńskie lake and the Zamkowe ("Castle lake"). A defensive wall was built at this spot, and later, a settlement was constructed there as well. The place is mentioned in a twelfth-century document regarding a battle in which Henry of Sandomierz was killed. Under the Latinized name "Wambresia" the town was mentioned in a 1251 document issued at Chełmża. Bishop Heidenreich of Bishopric of Chełmno received the Chełmno Land from the pope. The Polish duke Konrad I of Masovia turned possession of the settlement over to the bishop of Chełmno. This created a problem because the Teutonic Knights were in control of the Chełmno Land, and a dispute began between the Bishop of Chełmno and the Knights. The Pope at the time, Innocent IV, was not keen to continue the dispute and installed the Bishop as the rightful ruler of the settlement. This disagreement was the first historical mention of the settlement. In 1251, a large church, St. Simon and Judah, was built in the town.

At the beginning of the 14th century, a revitalization of the church and the city was begun, led by the then-current bishop of Chełmno, Herman von Prizna. A wall was also constructed around the city to further its protection, and a castle was constructed in the city's northwestern corner. However, the city, the wall, the surrounding villages, and the castle were all completely destroyed in the Thirteen Years' War between the Teutonic Knights and the Poles. Afterwards, all of these were reconstructed, and the castle at Wambresia served as the official residence of the Bishops until 1773.

The town joined the Prussian Confederation, which opposed Teutonic rule, and upon the request of which King Casimir IV Jagiellon reincorporated the territory to the Kingdom of Poland in 1454. In May 1454 the town pledged allegiance to the Polish King in Toruń. After the end of the Thirteen Years' War, which ended with the Second Peace of Thorn (1466), the Teutonic Knights renounced claims to the town, and recognized it as part of Poland. Administratively it was located in the Chełmno Voivodeship in the province of Royal Prussia in the Greater Poland Province of the Polish Crown. Bishop of Chełmno and Polish diplomat, Jan Dantyszek, with the consent of King Sigismund I the Old, issued a new privilege to Wąbrzeźno and granted the coat of arms in 1534.

The town was plundered by the Swedes during the Polish–Swedish War in 1629, and destroyed during the Swedish invasion of Poland in 1655. Wąbrzeźno was hit by a plague epidemic in 1630 and a major portion of the town also burned down in a devastating fire in 1700.

After the First Partition of Poland in 1772, the town became a possession of the Kingdom of Prussia, and between 1807 and 1815, the town was part of the Duchy of Warsaw, before it was reannexed by Prussia. Another devastating fire destroyed much of the town in 1792, and afterwards Frederick William II of Prussia allowed the demolition of the castle to supply stones for the rebuilding of the destroyed parts of the town.

The town was subjected to Germanisation policies. In 1788, the city was renamed Briesen, by which is still referred to in German. The Prussian authorities initiated German colonization, by bringing German settlers to change the region's ethnic composition. Polish inhabitants took part in 19th-century Polish uprisings, including the November Uprising, Greater Poland uprising (1848) and the January Uprising. Anti-Polish policies intensified after the town became part of the German Empire in 1871. To resist Germanisation policies, Poles founded various organizations, including a branch of the "Sokół" Polish Gymnastic Society.

The residents of the city, mostly made their living through agriculture and brewing. Industrialization arrived in the middle of the 19th century. Industrial development flourished in the city due to its location and its access to railroads. By 1900, the city contained cement factories, as well as automotive and mechanical engineering centers. Along with this the traditional industries of the town were also modernized, with state-of-the-art breweries and creameries taking shape.

On January 20, 1920, the town was reintegrated with Poland, which regained independence, the historic Polish name was restored, and was made seat of its county. Polish cultural life was revived in the interbellum.

Wąbrzeźno was invaded by Nazi Germany in September 1939, during World War II, and was occupied by Germany until 1945. The Germans carried out mass arrests of Poles in October 1939. Around 1,000 Poles were arrested and imprisoned, mostly in a temporary concentration camp, established in a local factory, but some also in the local prison. Some of these Poles were murdered in Skrwilno between October 15 and November 15, 1939 and in Nielub on October 17, 1939, while most were murdered in large massacres in Łopatki and Kurkocin (see Intelligenzaktion). Nearly 4,000 Polish residents of Wąbrzeźno and the surrounding communities were sent to Nazi concentration camps, established in Potulice and Toruń, and expelled. The Germans banned the use of the Polish language, liquidated Polish schools and organizations, and resettled the town with German colonists, however, the Poles still organized the underground Polish resistance movement.

The Red Army captured the town in January 1945, but this was hardly an improvement, as the Soviets conducted mass deportations, in which 776 people from the county, including 261 people from the town were deported to labor camps in the Soviet Union. Most of these deportees died while being transported or in the labor camps, and most were Polish citizens.

The city lost its status as county seat in 1975, but regained in 1999.

Historical population
1772: 502
1943: 10,051
1988: 12,396
1998: 14,283
2003: 14,523
2004: 13,971

Culture 
There is a Municipal Museum in Wąbrzeźno (Muzeum Miejskie w Wąbrzeźnie).

Notable people 
 Bernard of Wąbrzeźno (1575–1603), Polish Roman Catholic priest and a Benedictine monk 
 Ludwig von Erlichshausen (1410–1467), Grand Master of the Teutonic Knights
 Maciej Freimut (born 1967), canoeist, Olympic medallist
 Magdalena Fularczyk (born 1986), rower, Olympic gold medallist
 Gisela Hahn (born 1943), German film actress
 Roy Henkel (1905–1981), German-Canadian ice hockey player 
 Grzegorz Knapp (1979–2014), speedway rider
 Karolina Kudłacz-Gloc (born 1985), handball player
 Walther Nernst (1864–1941), chemist, Nobel Prize winner for the Nernst equation
 Franciszek Nogalski (1911–1939), Roman Catholic priest 
 Tadeusz Nowicki (born 1958), industrialist

References

External links
 Wambresia/Briesen 1251 Prussian Document from Pope for Heidenreich, Bishop of Kulm
 Official town webpage

Cities and towns in Kuyavian-Pomeranian Voivodeship
Wąbrzeźno County
Pomeranian Voivodeship (1919–1939)